Asplenium daghestanicum, the Dagestanian spleenwort, is a species of spleenwort that is endemic to Dagestan in Russia. It is known only from Agulsky and Khivsky districts. It can be found on shaded schist rocks in the middle montane zone, at elevations from 1,800 to 2,300 m. Its population is estimated to be 1,500–2,000 mature individuals. It is threatened by the effects of climate change on its microhabitat.

References

daghestanicum
Critically endangered plants
Endemic flora of Russia
Plants described in 1906